Maxime Sivis (born 1 April 1998) is a professional footballer who plays as a right-back for Guingamp. Born in France, he is a youth international for the DR Congo.

Club career
Sivis is a product of the youth academies of Cholet and Angers, and began his senior career with the reserves of Angers. He couldn't find opportunities with the first team, so moved to Quevilly-Rouen in 2018. In the summer of 2019, he transferred to Concarneau. The following summer, he moved to Red Star in the Championnat National. On 7 June 2021, Sivis signed his first professional contract with Ligue 2 side En Avant Guingamp until 2024. He made his professional debut with Guingamp in a 2–1 Ligue 2 loss to Sochaux on 21 September 2021, scoring his side's only goal in the 45+2' minute.

International career
Born in France, Sivis is of Congolese descent. He represented the DR Congo U18 side in a friendly 8-0 loss to the England U17s in October 2015.

References

External links
 

1998 births
Living people
People from Cholet
Democratic Republic of the Congo footballers
Democratic Republic of the Congo youth international footballers
French footballers
Democratic Republic of the Congo people of French descent
French sportspeople of Democratic Republic of the Congo descent
Association football fullbacks
Angers SCO players
US Quevilly-Rouen Métropole players
Red Star F.C. players
En Avant Guingamp players
Ligue 2 players
Championnat National players
Championnat National 2 players
Championnat National 3 players
Footballers from Pays de la Loire
Black French sportspeople